The Detroit People Mover (DPM) is a  elevated automated people mover system in Detroit, Michigan, United States. The system operates in a one-way loop on a single track encircling downtown Detroit, using Intermediate Capacity Transit System linear induction motor technology developed by the Urban Transportation Development Corporation. 

The People Mover is supplemented by the QLine streetcar, which connects the system with Midtown, New Center, and the Detroit Amtrak station. The system also connects to DDOT and SMART bus routes as part of a comprehensive network of transportation in metropolitan Detroit.

History

Planning 
The Detroit People Mover has its origins in 1966, with the creation of the federal Urban Mass Transportation Administration (UMTA) to develop new types of transit. In 1975, following the failure to produce any large-scale results and increased pressure to show results, UMTA created the Downtown People Mover Program (DPM) and sponsored a nationwide competition that offered federal funds to cover much of the cost of planning and construction of such a system. UMTA reviewed thirty-five full proposals. From these, they selected proposals from Cleveland, Houston, Los Angeles, and St. Paul.  In addition, UMTA decided they would approve proposals from Baltimore, Detroit, and Miami to develop People Mover systems if they could do so with existing grant commitments. Of the seven cities with UMTA approval for their People Mover proposals, only Detroit and Miami persevered to build and operate systems.

The Ford Motor Company was involved in one of the designs of the People Mover and had hired AlScott Service Company to design and build a room size working model of the system. This model was used for Ford's proposals in their attempt to build the system.

The People Mover was intended to be the downtown distributor for a proposed city and metro-wide light rail transit system for Detroit in the early 1980s; however, funding was scaled back.  President Gerald Ford had promised $600 million in federal funds. Plans included a subway line along Woodward Avenue that would turn into a street level train at McNichols and eventually go all the way to Pontiac, with additional rail lines running along Gratiot and a commuter line between Detroit and Port Huron. Inability of local leaders to come to an agreement led to the $600 million commitment being withdrawn by the Reagan administration, though plans for the People Mover still moved forward. At the time of planning, the system was projected to have a ridership of 67,700 daily.

During construction, the system was initially owned by the Southeastern Michigan Transportation Authority (SEMTA). It was acquired by the Detroit Transportation Corporation (DTC) on October 4, 1985. The DTC was incorporated in 1985 as a Michigan Public Body Corporate for the purpose of acquiring, owning, constructing, furnishing, equipping, completing, operating, improving, enlarging, and/or disposing of the Central Automated Transit Systems (CATS). The DTC was created by the City of Detroit, Michigan pursuant to Act 7 of Public Acts of 1967 and is a component unit of the City of Detroit and accounts its activity as per proprietary funds.

Opening 

The Downtown People Mover (DPM) officially opened to the public on July 31, 1987. In the first year, an average of 11,000 riders used the People Mover each day; the one-day record was 54,648. Originally, the People Mover System was operated and maintained by UTDC on a month-to-month basis; the DTC took over operations and maintenance on November 18, 1988.

Service disruptions from construction 
In October 1998, the implosion of the J. L. Hudson Department Store damaged part of the nearby track and forced the system to shut down. The system ran limited service until the track was completely repaired in late 1999.

In 2000, the David Whitney Building closed, cutting off access to the Grand Circus Park station. The station later reopened, though it lacked elevator access until the station was renovated with the building's reopening in 2015.

During construction of Compuware World Headquarters, the Cadillac Center station was temporarily closed as part of the parking structure was built around it. The station remained largely untouched and unmodified, although the entrance was slightly expanded, and a walkway to the garage was added.

In 2002, the original Renaissance Center station was closed and demolished. This was part of a multi-year renovation of the Renaissance Center, in which concrete berms in front of the complex were removed to make it more inviting to the rest of downtown. The system ran limited service due to the gap in the track during construction, leading to a drop in ridership, before the new station and track opened on September 3, 2004. The original station's tile artwork was destroyed in the demolition, though its creator, George Woodman, designed a replacement work for the new station.

The Grand Circus Park station closed for renovations on August 16, 2014, as part of renovation work in the David Whitney Building. A new station lobby was added with a direct entrance to the building, and an elevator was added to provide step-free access. Trains continued to operate in a one-way loop, bypassing Grand Circus Park, for most of the station's closure, though the line was briefly split into two segments (with transfers at Millender Center) while part of the track was closed. The Grand Circus Park station officially reopened on June 13, 2015. A connecting QLine station was added shortly thereafter, opening with the system in May 2017.

Changes in direction 
The system originally ran counter-clockwise. It changed directions to run clockwise in August 2008, following a short closure to replace sections of the track. This change in direction was intended to reduce the time needed to connect between more popular destinations. The switch to clockwise also reduced the time required to complete the loop, as the route, run clockwise, has one short, relatively steep uphill climb, and then coasts downhill for most of the route, allowing trains to use gravity to accelerate.

In late December 2019, the People Mover tested counter-clockwise operation. The system began running counter-clockwise on weekends in February 2020, and then switched back to counter-clockwise full-time on March 1.

COVID-19 shutdown and reopening 
The People Mover shut down on March 30, 2020, due to reduced ridership amid the COVID-19 pandemic. 

After a planned 2021 reopening was postponed, the system resumed limited service on May 20, 2022, running six days a week, stopping at six of the 13 stations (Michigan Avenue, Huntington Place, West Riverfront, Millender Center, Greektown, Grand Circus Park). Broadway and Financial District reopened thirteen days later on June 2, followed by Renaissance Center and Fort/Cass on September 14, and Bricktown on November 21. The other two stations remain temporarily closed as of March 2023. 

To attract riders, fares were initially waived from reopening day through August, and later extended through October 2022.

Fares 
The regular fare is $0.75 per trip, with discounts available for seniors. Children 5 and under ride free.  Fares can be paid using quarters at the turnstiles, or with tokens dispensed by machines in the stations. Monthly and annual passes are available, and can be purchased online or at the Detroit Transportation Corporation's office in the Buhl Building.

The fare was originally $0.50, until it was raised to the current rate in November 2011.

Cost-effectiveness and use 
In 2006, it was reported that the People Mover costs $8.3 million annually in city and state subsidies to run, and the system has drawn criticism for its cost-effectiveness. In every year between 1997 and 2006, the cost per passenger mile exceeded $3, and was $4.28 in 2009, compared with Detroit bus routes that operate at $0.82 (for comparison, the New York City Subway operates at $0.30 per passenger mile).

The Mackinac Center for Public Policy reported that according to a 2004 survey, fewer than 30% of the riders were Detroit residents and that Saturday ridership (likely out-of-towners) dwarfed that of weekday usage.

Prior to the COVID-19 pandemic, the People Mover generated about $1 million to $1.5 million in revenue annually from fares, conventions, and advertising space. There was a mix of riders in 2019: about 50% to 60% were office workers in the downtown area, while others included weekend social riders, area residents, tourists, and conventiongoers.

Expansion proposals 
There have been proposals to extend the People Mover northward to the New Center and neighborhoods not within walking distance of the city's downtown. A proposal was put forward by Marsden Burger, former manager of the People Mover, to double the length of the route by extending the People Mover along Woodward Avenue to West Grand Boulevard and into the New Center area. New stops would have included the Amtrak station, Wayne State University, the Detroit Medical Center, and Henry Ford Hospital. The plan was proposed at a tentative cost of $150–200 million, and would have been paid for by a combination of public and private financing. Much of the proposed route to New Center would eventually be followed by the QLine streetcar, which opened in 2017.

Rolling stock 

The People Mover's fleet consists of twelve automated Intermediate Capacity Transit System cars, built by the Urban Transportation Development Corporation in Kingston, Ontario. They operate in two-car trains.

The trains originally bore a white livery with green and yellow stripes. Beginning in the early 2000s, the cars began to be wrapped with advertisements; by the 2010s, every car was adorned with an ad wrap.

Operations and maintenance 
The People Mover's operations center, garage, and maintenance facilities are located at the Times Square station.  Cars enter the garage via a siding, which branches off from the main line to a second platform at Times Square. This siding allows the system to be used in a two-way bypass manner when part of the circular track is closed. Maintenance equipment is lifted up to track level by crane, but not stored with the DPM cars.

Governance 
The People Mover is owned and operated by the Detroit Transportation Corporation (DTC), an agency of the Detroit city government, headquartered on the fourth floor of the Buhl Building in the city's Financial District (across the street from the Financial District station). The agency is governed by a six-member Board of Directors, which appoints a General Manager to oversee day-to-day operations.

Transit Police and security 
In addition to operating the People Mover, the DTC is also the parent organization of the Detroit Transit Police. The agency's officers have full arrest powers, with jurisdiction over the People Mover, DDOT buses, the Rosa Parks Transit Center, and the QLINE.

Originally formed only to patrol the People Mover, the Transit Police began DDOT patrols in March 2014, in response a spike in crime on buses. As of May 2022, the Transit Police no longer conduct regular patrols on the People Mover; the DTC now contracts with private security firm City Shield Security Services for People Mover patrols.

Ridership 
The system was designed to move up to 15 million riders a year. In 2008 it served approximately 2 million riders. This meant the system averaged about 7,500 people per day, about 2.5 percent of its daily peak capacity of 288,000. In 2006, the Mover filled less than 10 percent of its seats.

Among the busiest periods was the five days around the 2006 Super Bowl XL, when 215,910 patrons used the service. In addition to major downtown concerts and sporting events, other high ridership times include the week of the annual North American International Auto Show in January and the Youmacon anime convention at the end of October, ever since the convention expanded in 2012 to use Huntington Place in addition to the Renaissance Center. The system had 92,384 riders during the 2014 extended con weekend.

Incidents

1990 derailment 
In 1990, a train derailed at Cadillac Center after a manhole cover fell onto the track.

2015 derailment 
On January 22, 2015, at approximately 10:10 PM, one of the cars jumped a rail, hitting the platform at Times Square. No injuries were reported, and the system was shut down for 17 hours for an investigation. According to a DTC press release, a bracket beneath the train dislodged and caught underneath the rear car, causing the train to disengage from the track. A door was dislodged upon impact.

2016 accident 
On May 15, 2016, 53-year-old Michael Whyte fell onto the track between the cars of a stopped train at Times Square. The train then departed automatically as normal, dragging Whyte along the track to his death. Following this incident, bollards were added to the system's platforms, preventing passengers from falling into the space between the cars. Whyte's family filed a lawsuit, alleging negligence on the part of the DTC. Whyte's death is, to date, the only fatal accident in the People Mover's history.

Stations 
The network has 13 stations. As the system runs in a one-way loop with a single track, each station only has one side platform, except for Times Square, which has a siding leading to the system's garage and an island platform.

Public art 
Originally, the 13 stations were not planned to have any distinctive features. However, in 1984, after construction had recently begun, Irene Walt assembled a volunteer committee to persuade the project agency to include artwork in each station. Called the Downtown Detroit People Mover Art Commission (later known as Art in the Stations), they raised $2 million to finance the project. As a result, there are 18 new original pieces of art spread throughout the stations, plus a piece from 1903 that had previously been in storage, on permanent loan from the Detroit Institute of Arts. 

The commission's efforts and art installation were documented in a 30-minute film, Art in the Stations, by Sue Marx and Pamela Conn, who had recently won an Academy Award for the short documentary Young at Heart. Art in the Stations premiered at the Detroit Institute of Arts in 1989. 

In 2004, a coffee table book by Walt, also titled Art in the Stations, was published, with photographs by Balthazar Korab and information on all the station artwork and the artists who created them.

Art was completed with the system opening in 1987 unless otherwise noted:

 Grand Circus Park
 Catching Up (Artist: J. Seward Johnson Jr – bronze statue)
 Times Square
 In Honor of W. Hawkins Ferry (Artist: Tom Phardel / Pewabic Pottery – glazed tile)
 Untitled (1993) (Artist: Anat Shiftan / Pewabic Pottery – tile mural)
 Michigan Avenue
 Voyage (Artist: Allie McGhee – tile mural)
 On the Move (Artist: Kirk Newman – cast bronze shape on tile)
 Fort/Cass
 Untitled (Artist: Farley Tobin – tile mural)
 Progression II (1993) (Artist: Sandra jo Osip – bronze sculpture)
 Huntington Place
 Calvacade of Cars (1988) (Artist: Larry Ebel/Linda Cianciolo Scarlett – mural)
 West Riverfront
 Voyage (Artist: Gerome Kamrowski – venetian glass mosaic)
 Financial District
  'D' for Detroit (Artist: Joyce Kozloff – hand painted ceramic mural)
 Millender Center
 Detroit New Morning (Artist: Alvin D. Loving Jr. - painted glazed tiles)
 Renaissance Center
 Dreamers and Voyagers Come to Detroit (1987–2002) (Artist: George Woodman – ceramic tile mural, destroyed with station demolition)
 Siberian Ram (1993) (Artist: Marshall Fredericks – cast bronze sculpture)
 Path Games (2004) (Artist: George Woodman – ceramic tile mural)
 Bricktown
 Beaubien Passage (Artist: Glen Michaels – bas relief on porcelain panels)
 Greektown
 Neon for the Greektown Station (Artist: Stephen Antonakos – free form neon light display)
 Cadillac Center
 In Honour of Mary Chase Stratton (Artist: Diana Kulisek Pancioli/Pewabic Pottery – tile mural interspersed with bronze plaque by Carlo Romanelli 1903)
 Broadway
 The Blue Nile (Artist: Charles McGee – painted mural panels)
 Untitled (Artist: Jun Kaneko – tile)

See also 

 Art on the Move
 List of rapid transit systems
 List of United States rapid transit systems by ridership
 Metromover
 Transportation in metropolitan Detroit

References

External links 
 Official website
 YouTube.com: On-Ride Video of the Detroit People Mover
 National Transit Database profile of the Detroit People Mover

 
1987 establishments in Michigan
ART people movers
Culture of Detroit
Downtown Detroit
Economy of Detroit
People mover systems in the United States
Railway lines opened in 1987
Rapid transit in Michigan
Transportation in Detroit
Urban people mover systems